Vyacheslav ("Slava") Viktorovych Shyrshov (born 9 July 1979) is a freestyle swimmer from Ukraine, who won the gold medal in the men's 50 metres freestyle event at the 2003 Summer Universiade in Daegu. He represented his native country at two consecutive Summer Olympics, starting in 2000 in Sydney, Australia.

Awards and Achievements
 2000 Sep | XXVII Olympic Games SYDNEY, Australia
 4 × 100 m RELAY MEDLEY MEN — 11th place
 2001 Jun | The 9th FINA World Swimming Championships FUKUOKA, Japan
 50m Backstroke — 8th place
 50m Freestyle — 6th place
 2001 Aug | The 21st Universiade BEIJING, China
 50m Freestyle — Silver medalist of the World Universiade
 100m Freestyle — Bronze medalist of the World Universiade
 4 × 100 m RELAY MEDLEY MEN — Silver medalist of the World Universiade
 2001 Nov | Grand-Prix ARENA, Italy
 Silver medalist at major international Grand Prix
 2001 Dec | European Championships shot course ANTWERP, Belgium
 4x50m RELAY FREESTYLE MEN — Winner and NEW European Record
 2002 Apr | FINA Short Course Championships MOSCOW, Russia
 50m Backstroke — 8th place
 2002 Dec | European Championships shot course RIESA, Germany
 4x50m RELAY FREESTYLE MEN — Bronze medalist
 4x50m RELAY MEDLEY MEN — Bronze medalist
 2003 Aug | The 22nd Summer Universiade DAEGU, Republic Of Korea
 50m Freestyle — Winner of the World Universiade
 50m Backstroke — Bronze medalist of the World Universiade
 4 × 100 m RELAY MEDLEY MEN — Bronze medalist of the World Universiade
 2003 Dec | European Championships shot course DUBLIN, Ireland
 50m Backstroke — Silver medalist (Today, it is the best result in Ukraine)
 4x50m RELAY MEDLEY MEN — Bronze medalist
 2004 Aug | XXVIII Olympic Games ATHENS, Greece
 A member of the Olympic team of Ukraine

 2004 Dec | European Championships shot course VIENNA, Austria
 50m Backstroke — Silver medalist
 4x50m RELAY MEDLEY MEN — Silver medalist
 2005 Jun | The European Police championships swimming BERLIN, Germany
 4 × 100 m RELAY FREESTYLE MEN — Winner
 50m Freestyle — Silver medalist
 2005 Jul | XI th FINA World Swimming Championships MONTREAL, Canada
 A member of the World Cup
 2011 Sep | XIII European Masters Championships YALTA, Ukraine
 50m Freestyle — Winner
 50m Backstroke — Winner
 4x50m RELAY MEDLEY MEN — Winner and NEW World Record
 4x50m RELAY FREESTYLE MEN — Winner and NEW European Record
 4x50m RELAY MEDLEY MIX  — Winner
 4x50m RELAY FREESTYLE MIX — Winner
 2012 Jun | 14th World Masters Championships RICCIONE, Italy
 50m Freestyle — Winner
 50m Backstroke — Winner
 4x50m RELAY MEDLEY MEN — Winner and NEW World Record
 4x50m RELAY FREESTYLE MEN — Winner and NEW European Record

References
 Slava Shyrshov on www.sports-reference.com
 List of Ukrainian records in swimming

1979 births
Living people
Ukrainian male swimmers
Ukrainian male freestyle swimmers
Swimmers at the 2000 Summer Olympics
Swimmers at the 2004 Summer Olympics
Olympic swimmers of Ukraine
Universiade medalists in swimming
Universiade gold medalists for Ukraine
Universiade silver medalists for Ukraine
Universiade bronze medalists for Ukraine
Medalists at the 2001 Summer Universiade
Medalists at the 2003 Summer Universiade
Sportspeople from Luhansk